Eric M. Verdin is the 5th President and Chief Executive Officer of the Buck Institute for Research on Aging. He is a native of Belgium. Dr. Verdin is also a Professor of Medicine at University of California, San Francisco.

Selected publications 
Verdin has an h-index of 103.

References 

Year of birth missing (living people)
Living people
Belgian chief executives
University of Liège alumni
University of California, San Francisco faculty